The Satipaṭṭhāna Sutta (Majjhima Nikaya 10: The Discourse on the Establishing of Mindfulness), and the subsequently created Mahāsatipaṭṭhāna Sutta (Dīgha Nikāya 22: The Great Discourse on the Establishing of Mindfulness), are two of the most celebrated and widely studied discourses in the Pāli Canon of Theravada Buddhism, acting as the foundation for contemporary vipassana meditational practice. The Pāli texts of the Satipaṭṭhāna Sutta and the Mahāsatipaṭṭhāna Sutta are largely similar in content; the main difference being a section about the Four Noble Truths (Catu Ariya Sacca) in the Observation of Phenomena (Dhammānupassana), which is greatly expanded in the Mahāsatipaṭṭhāna Sutta. These suttas (discourses) stress the practice of sati (mindfulness) "for the purification of beings, for the overcoming of sorrow and lamentation, for the extinguishing of suffering and grief, for walking on the path of truth, for the realization of nibbāna."

Sources

Dating
While elements of the Satipathana sutta can be found in the Samyutta Nikaya and the Samyukta Nigama, which belong to the oldest strata of the Buddhist suttas, the elaborate Maha Satipatthana Sutta exists only in the Theravada Digha Nikaya. Bhante Sujato postulates that the sutta was compiled from elements from other suttas as late as 20 BCE.

Title translation and related literature 

English translations of the title, "," include: 
"The Arousing of Mindfulness Discourse" (Soma, 1999)
"The Foundations of Mindfulness Discourse"  (Nyanasatta, 1994)
"The Establishing of Mindfulness Discourse" (Thanissaro, 1995)

In regard to the prefix "Maha-" in the Pāli title of DN 22, this simply means "great," or "larger" and likely refers to DN 22's expanded section on mindfulness of the Four Noble Truths.

Various recensions and canonical placement
In the Pali Text Society (PTS) edition of the Canon, this text begins on the 55th page of the first volume of its three-volume Majjhima Nikaya (M i 55).

In the PTS edition of the Canon, the Mahāsatipaṭṭhāna Sutta begins on the 289th page of the second volume of the PTS' three-volume Digha Nikaya (D ii 289).

In the Chinese Canon, the Nian Chu Jing (念處經, Smṛtyupasthāna Sūtra), based on a Sarvastivadin source, is found on page 582 of the Taisho Tripitaka Vol. 1, Madhyama gama No. 26. Another similar sutra is in the Ekottara Agama (EA 12.1) and it is called the Ekayāna sutra, Direct Path sūtra.

An early Smṛtyupasthāna Sūtra version also survives inside some of the large Prajñāpāramitā sutras (Tibetan and Chinese), one of which has been translated into English by Edward Conze. These passages on mindfulness are treated as the first element in the 37 wings to awakening. According to Bhante Sujato, "This version of the satipaṭṭhāna material displays a refreshing simplicity that may indicate that it lies close to the early sources."

There does exist in Tibetan translation a "Saddharma Smṛtyupasthāna Sūtra" (dam pa'i chos dran pa nye bar bzhag pa'i mdo//dampé chödren panyé barzhak pé do) but this is a very large early Mahayana sutra and is an entirely different text. Bhante Sujato completed an extensive comparative survey of the various recensions of Sutta, entitled A History of Mindfulness.

Later sources
The Satipaṭṭhāna material, including the various meditation objects and practices, is treated in various later Abhidharma works such as the Theravada Vibhanga and Paṭisambhidāmagga, the Sarvastivada Dharmaskandha, the Jñānapraṣṭhāna, the Śāriputrābhidharma and the Arthaviniscaya Sutra.

Later works, such as the Abhidharmakośakārikā of Vasubandhu, and Asanga's Yogacarabhumi and Abhidharma-samuccaya, also comment on the four satipatthanas.

Contents

Contents of the Pali version

In the Satipatthana Sutta, Majjhima Nikaya 10, the Buddha identifies four "foundations of mindfulness" or "frames of reference," on which he contemplates or focusses after leaving behind the worldly life: kāyā (body), vedanā (sensations/feelings aroused by perception), cittā (mind/consciousness), and dhammas (elements of the Buddhist teachings). The sutta then gives an overview of Buddhist practices, under these four headings:

Kāyā (body):
mindfulness of breathing, calming the bodily formations (see also the Anapanasati Sutta);
clear comprehension of all postures and actions;
reflections on the repulsiveness of the body-parts;
reflections on the elements which are in the body: earth, water, fire, and air;
charnel ground contemplations;
in these ways, remaining focussed on the body itself; or clear comprehension of arising and vanishing with regard to the body; or sustained mindfulness of the presence of the body.
Vedanā (sensations/feelings aroused by perception):
 understanding feelings as pleasant, unpleasant, or neither-pleasant-nor-unpleasant (neutral) feelings;
 in this way, remaining focussed on feelings in themselves; or clear comprehension of arising and vanishing with regard to feelings; or sustained mindfulness of the presence of feelings.
Cittā (mind/consciousness), awareness of the presence and absence of the unwholesome states of the three poisons (lust, hate, delusion); and the presence or absence of the wholesome states related to dhyana:
 Three poisons:
 lust (sarāga) or without lust (vītarāga)
 hate (sadosa) or without hate (vītadosa)
 delusion (samoha) or without delusion (vītamoha)
 Dhyana-related factors:
 contracted (sakhitta) or scattered (vikkhitta)
 lofty (mahaggata) or not lofty (amahaggata)
 surpassable (sa-uttara) or unsurpassed (anuttara)
 quieted (samāhita) or not quieted (asamāhita)
 released (vimutta) or not released (avimutta)
 In this way, remaining focussed on the mind itself; or clear comprehension of arising and vanishing with regard to mind; or sustained mindfulness of the presence of mind
Dhammā (elements of the Buddhist teachings):
the five hindrances: awareness of the presence or absence, arising and abandoning, and no future arising, of sensual desire, ill will, sloth and torpor, restlessness and remorse, and uncertainty;
the five skandhas, the aggregates  of clinging: the discernment of the existence, the origination, and the disappearance, of form, feeling, perception, formations (mental dispositions), and consciousness;
the six sense-bases, and the fetters that arise in dependence on them: discerning the internal sense-media (eye, ear, nose, tongue, body, intellect), the external sense-media (forms, sounds, odours, tangibles), the arising of fetters in dependence on the six-sense bases, the abandonment of the arisen fetters, and the future non-arising of these fetters;
the Seven factors of awakening: awareness of the presence or absence, the arising, and the culmination, of sati'(mindfulness), dhamma vicaya (investigation of dhammas), viriya (energy, effort, persistence, determination), pīti (rapture), passaddhi (tranquility, relaxation (of body and mind)), samadhi (clear awareness, concentration), upekkha (equanimity);
the Four Noble Truths.

Comparison of the content in other sources
The Sarvāstivāda Smṛtyupasthāna Sūtra differs in some ways from the Theravada version, including postures as the first contemplation instead of breathing for example. According to Bhante Sujato, it seems to emphasize samatha or calm abiding, while the Theravadin version emphasizes Vipassana or insight. The text also often refers to 'bhikkhus and bhikkhunīs' instead of just male bhikkhus.

A section on Smṛtyupasthāna is found in various Tibetan and Chinese recensions of large Prajñāpāramitā sutras, such as the 25,000 line version translated by Edward Conze. This skeletal version of the Smṛtyupasthāna is incorporated into the larger sutra and thus appears as part of the Buddha's discourse to Subhuti. It only outlines specific practices for the contemplation of the body, the other three satipatthanas are simply enumerated.

Various scholars have attempted to use the numerous early sources to trace an "ur-text" i.e. the original satipaṭṭhāna formula or the earliest sutta. Bronkhorst (1985) argues that the earliest form of the satipaṭṭhāna sutta only contained the observation of the impure body parts under mindfulness of the body, and that mindfulness of dhammas was originally just the observation of the seven awakening factors. Sujato's reconstruction similarly only retains the contemplation of the impure under mindfulness of the body, while including only the five hindrances and the seven awakening factors under mindfulness of dhammas. According to Analayo, mindfulness of breathing was probably absent from the original scheme, noting that one can easily contemplate the body's decay taking an external object, that is, someone else's body, but not be externally mindfull of the breath, that is, someone else's breath. 

Interpretation and practice

Stage of practice leading to jhana

According to Rupert Gethin, "[t]he sutta is often read today as describing a pure form of insight (vipassanā) meditation that bypasses calm (samatha) meditation and the four absorptions (jhāna)." Yet, in the older Buddhist tradition, mindfulness aided in abandoning the five hindrances, which then leads into the first jhana. According to Gethin, the early Buddhist texts have "a broadly consistent vision" regarding meditation practice. Various practices lead to the development of the factors of awakening, which are not only the means to, but also the constituents of awakening.

Gethin, followed by Polak and  Arbel, notes that there is a "definite affinity" between the bojjhaṅgā, the seven factors of awakening, and the four jhanas, which actualize the Buddhist practices aiming at calming the mind. According to Gethin, satipatthana and anapanasati are related to a formula that summarizes the Buddhist path to awakening as "abandoning the hindrances, establishing [...] mindfulness, and developing the seven factors of awakening." This results in a "heightened awareness," "overcoming distracting and disturbing emotions," which are not particular elements of the path to awakening, but rather common disturbing and distracting emotions.

According to Sujato, samatha and vipassana are complementary elements of the Buddhist path. Satipatthana explicates mindfulness, the seventh limb of the eightfold path, and is to be understood as an integral part of this path.

Polak, elaborating on Vetter, notes that the onset of the first dhyana is described as a quite natural process, due to the preceding efforts to restrain the senses and the nurturing of wholesome states. According to Grzegorz Polak, the four upassanā do not refer to four different foundations of which one should be aware, but are an alternate description of the jhanas, describing how the samskharas are tranquilized:
 the six sense-bases which one needs to be aware of (kāyānupassanā);
 contemplation on vedanās, which arise with the contact between the senses and their objects (vedanānupassanā);
 the altered states of mind to which this practice leads (cittānupassanā);
 the development from the five hindrances  to the seven factors of enlightenment (dhammānupassanā).

Various practices
There are a variety of ways that one could use the methods described in the  including:
 Focus on a single method. The method most written about in the English language is that of mindfulness of breath.
 Practice the various methods individually in succession. 
 Maintain breath mindfulness as a primary object while using other methods to address non-breath stimuli.
 Practice multiple methods either in tandem or in a context-driven manner.

According to Analāyo and Soma, writing from a traditional point of view, the Papañcasudani recommends a different satipaṭṭhāna depending on whether a person:
tends more toward affective craving or intellectual speculation; and,
is more measured in their responses or quick reacting.
Based on these two dimensions the commentary's recommended personality-based satipaṭṭhāna is reflected in the grid shown at right.

Soma (2003, p. xxiv) adds that all practitioners (regardless of their character and temperament) should also practice mindfulness of Postures (moving, standing, sitting, lying down) and Clear Understanding, about which he writes: "The whole practice of mindfulness depends on the correct grasp of the exercises included in the two parts referred to here."

English commentaries

, p. 59-123

See also

Sutta Piṭaka
Satipatthana (Four Foundations of Mindfulness)
Mahasati MeditationKāyagatāsati Sutta Related practices:
Anussati
Bhāvanā
Sampajanna
Patikulamanasikara

Notes

Subnotes

References

Sources

 

 
 Bullitt, John T. (2002). Beyond the Tipitaka: A Field Guide to Post-canonical Pali Literature.  Available on-line at http://www.accesstoinsight.org/lib/authors/bullitt/fieldguide.html#atthakatha.

 
 
 
 
 
 Gyori, Thomas I. (1996). The Foundations of Mindfulness (Satipatthāna) as a Microcosm of the Theravāda Buddhist World View (M.A. dissertation). Cited in Anālayo (2006). Washington: American University.
 

 Hamilton, Sue (1996; reprinted 2001). Identity and Experience: The Constitution of the Human Being according to Early Buddhism. Oxford: Luzac Oriental. .

 

 
 
 
 Nyanasatta Thera (trans.) (1994). The Foundations of Mindfulness (MN 10).  Available on-line at http://www.accesstoinsight.org/tipitaka/mn/mn.010.nysa.html.
 
 Rhys Davids, T.W. & William Stede (eds.) (1921-5). The Pali Text Society's Pali–English Dictionary. Chipstead: Pali Text Society. A general on-line search engine for the PED is available at http://dsal.uchicago.edu/dictionaries/pali/.

 
 

 
 
 
 

 
 Vipassana Research Institute (trans.) (1996). : The Great Discourse on Establishing Mindfulness''.  Seattle, WA: Vipassana Research Publications of America. .

External links

Pali text (Satipatthana Sutta)
 Satipatthana Sutta in the original Pali SuttaCentral
Translations (Satipatthana Sutta)
 
 Satipatthana Sutta: Frames of Reference, translation by Thanissaro Bhikkhu
 Mindfulness Meditation, translation by Bhante Sujato
 Satipatthana Sutta. The Discourse on the Arousing of Mindfulness, translation by Soma Thera
Translation (Maha-Satipatthana Sutta)
 The Longer Discourse on Mindfulness Meditation , translation by Bhikkhu Sujato
 Maha-satipatthana Sutta, translation by Thanissaro Bhikkhu
 Maha-satipatthana Sutta: The Great Frames of Reference, translation by Thanissaro Bhikkhu
Recitation (Satipatthana Sutta)
 Global Online Satipatthana Recitation
 Satipatthana Sutta read aloud (talking book) by Sally Clough

Majjhima Nikaya
Theravada Buddhist texts
Pali Buddhist texts